Sako Shahinian (born 1980) is an American-Armenian illustrator whose artwork has been featured in System of a Down projects.

Biography
Sako Shahinian is an artist designer with a multi disciplinary background. He believes good design with purpose can bring positive change to the world. Sako specializes in process driven identify development and the implementation of strategy to all subsequent facets of a brand, organization or entity. Currently he is the creative director at Sierra Designs where he leads the brand revitalization efforts.

Sako Shahinian was born in 1980 in Beirut, Lebanon. From a young age he picked up the pencil and began making marks on paper. Those marks quickly became images of what he saw and what he was curious about. Never letting down his pencil he nurtured and sharpened his skill until people called it talent. That recognition eventually got him attending Los Angeles County High School of the Arts and later In 2004 Sako, went on to graduate from Art Center College of Design with a bachelor of fine arts with honors in illustration.

• 1999 He earned the opportunity to paint the Woody Guthrie Exhibit's main mural with Adam Dryden at the Gene Autry Western Heritage Museum. 
• 2001, Sako worked on a book project with Serj Tankian from System of a Down. His artwork accompanied Serj's poems.
• 2004, He created the new System of a Down logo in coalition with Velvet Hammer productions.
• 2004 & 2015 He has illustrated System of a Down's "Souls Concert" poster.
• 2005, his illustration of Jack Nicholson from the movie The Passenger was published in The New Yorker. He has worked closely with a wide pallet of companies, designing CD covers, packaging material, creating corporate identities, and marketing print materials.
• 2005-2015, Illustrated dozens of covers and editorial illustrations for The progressive Magazine 
• 2006, Five For Fighting Music Video DNA Productions, Director: Vem, Illustrator: Sako Shahinian, Animation: UVPH, Producer: Jonathan Lia
• 2007, FP Magazine Editorial Illustrations
• 2008, Wiz Khalifa Music Video Warner Bros. Records/Rostrom Records, Director: Ara Soudjian, Production Designer: Sako Shahinian
• 2008, Elect the Dead, album book design for Serj Tankian 
• 2009, Nintend World Store Project, Motion graphics street display (Mind Opera Project)
• 2011, logo/identity for XYZ Films
• 2012-2015, Creative director of Ticla. Brand building with Founder Rich Hill and director–marketing & ops Meghan Kearns
• 2015-2016, Creative director of Sierra Designs

External links 
 SakoShahinian.com

Ethnic Armenian artists
1980 births
American people of Armenian descent
Living people
Artists from Beirut
Lebanese people of Armenian descent
American illustrators
Lebanese emigrants to the United States
Los Angeles County High School for the Arts alumni